Craig Stevens may refer to:

 Craig Stevens (actor) (1918–2000), American actor
 Craig Stevens (presenter) (born 1977), British television and radio presenter
 Craig Stevens (swimmer) (born 1980), Australian swimmer
 Craig Stevens (American football) (born 1984), American football player
 Craig Stevens, a Beverly Hills police officer who pleaded guilty to lying during the investigation of Anthony Pellicano